KZPK (98.9 FM) is a radio station in St. Cloud, Minnesota airing a country music format. The station is owned by Leighton Broadcasting.

About
KZPK broadcasts a country music format known on-air as "Wild Country 99." The station uses the slogan "Today's Hot New Country." The station's main competitors are WWJO ("98.1 Minnesota's New Country"), KEEY (102.1 "K102") and KMNB ("102.9 The Wolf"). KZPK is owned by Leighton Broadcasting, who also owns KCLD, KNSI, and KCML in the St. Cloud market.

HD Radio

During the summer of 2017, KZPK started broadcasting in HD Radio, carrying the main signal on HD1, a simulcast of KNSI 1450 AM on HD2 which is news/talk, and a classic rock format on HD3 branded as "Z-Rock 103.3".
the station's HD-3 channel is available over traditional radio on 103.3 FM via translator K277BS, licensed to St. Cloud. In 2021, KZPK HD3 quietly rebranded as "Real Rock Z103" with no change in format.

References

External links
Wild Country 99 official website

Radio stations in St. Cloud, Minnesota
Country radio stations in the United States
Radio stations established in 1995